Dirk Brandes (born 25 May 1974) is a German politician for the AfD and since 2021 member of the Bundestag, the federal diet.

Life and politics 

Brandes was born 1974 in the West German town of Langenhagen and was elected to the Bundestag in 2021.

References 

Living people
1974 births
Alternative for Germany politicians
Members of the Bundestag 2021–2025
21st-century German politicians
People from Hanover Region